Sean Pero MacPherson Cameron  (born 5 June 1974) is a New Zealand basketball coach and former player. A FIBA Hall of Fame member, he captained the New Zealand Tall Blacks from 2000 to 2010, helping lead New Zealand to the semifinal of the 2002 FIBA World Championship, earning an All-Tournament Team selection in the process.

Professional career

New Zealand NBL 
In the late 1980s and early 1990s, Cameron played for Mobil Marters Northland in the Conference Basketball League (CBL) where he won a championship in 1991. In 1992, Cameron began playing in the New Zealand National Basketball League for the Waikato Warriors. He went on to win 11 championships (the most in New Zealand NBL history – nine as a player, two as a coach), made the league's all-star five seven times, and won the Kiwi MVP award five times. During his career, he played for 11 seasons for the Waikato franchise (played under all three names – Warriors, Titans and Pistons) and seven seasons for the Auckland Rebels.

Australian NBL 
Cameron played five seasons in the Australian National Basketball League, two for the New Zealand Breakers and three for the Gold Coast Blaze. He played for both clubs in their respective inaugural seasons (Breakers in 2003–04 and Blaze in 2007–08). In a total of 130 ANBL games, he averaged 8.7 points, 4.2 rebounds and 2.0 assists per game.

Overseas 
Cameron played six and a half seasons overseas; one for the Ipoh Red Eagles of Malaysia in 1995–96, four for the Chester Jets of England, one for Banvit of Turkey in 2005–06, and half a season playing for Mahram Tehran of Iran in 2007.

National team career 
Cameron was first selected for the Tall Blacks in 1994. In 2000, for the Sydney Olympics, he became co-captain of the side, and was elevated to sole captain the following year. His most memorable moment as captain of the Tall Blacks came in 2002 when the team stunned the basketball world by making the semi-finals of the 2002 FIBA World Championship, eventually losing to Germany for fourth place. In the tournament, Cameron averaged 14.7 points, 5.0 rebounds and 3.6 assists per game and became the only non-NBA player to make the All-Tournament Team. He was joined on this team by established NBA superstars Dirk Nowitzki and Peja Stojaković and NBA rookies-to-be Yao Ming and Manu Ginóbili.

Cameron retired from international duties having played in two Summer Olympic Games (Sydney 2000 and Athens 2004) and three FIBA World Cups (2002, 2006 and 2010).

In August 2017, Cameron became the first New Zealander to be inducted into the FIBA Hall of Fame as a player, with the official ceremony occurring on 30 September 2017 in Switzerland.

Coaching career 
Cameron began his coaching career with the Wellington Saints in 2010, going on to lead the club to a sixth NBL championship and winning the Coach of the Year award in his first year. He led the Saints to a second consecutive championship in 2011 and subsequently joined the Gold Coast Blaze's coaching staff as an assistant in 2011–12.

In June 2011, Cameron was named an assistant coach of the Tall Blacks.

After two more seasons as the Saints' head coach, Cameron joined his beloved Waikato Pistons as the team's head coach/player development manager for the 2014 season. However, in November 2014, the Pistons pulled out of the 2015 season due to financial reasons and he subsequently returned to the Saints head coaching position on a one-year deal on 14 January 2015.

On 9 December 2015, Cameron joined the Gold Coast Rollers as the men's team head coach for the 2016 Queensland Basketball League season. He continued on as coach of the Rollers in 2017.

In December 2019, after eight years of being an assistant, Cameron was appointed head coach of the Tall Blacks. In September 2021, he was reappointed Tall Blacks coach for three years.

In October 2021, Cameron signed a one-year deal to be director of basketball for the Taranaki Airs. He also served as the team's assistant coach in 2022.

In December 2022, Cameron was appointed assistant coach of the Brisbane Bullets for the rest of the 2022–23 NBL season. He parted ways with the Bullets following the season.

Personal life
Cameron's mother, Mata, from the Māori Ngāpuhi iwi, is an ex-New Zealand representative and a long-time coach of New Zealand age groups. His father is Scottish. His sister, Jody, is a former Tall Fern, and represented New Zealand at the Olympic Games in Athens 2004. His brother, Ray, is a former Waikato Titans/Pistons player. His other sisters, Jeannie and Zeta, also played basketball at a high level.

Cameron and his wife Jennelle have three children. His sons, Tobias and Flynn, were part of the NZ Junior Tall Blacks team that competed at the 2017 FIBA Under-19 Basketball World Cup.

Honours 
 FIBA World Cup's All-Tournament Team – 2002
 Maori Sportsman of the Year – 2002
 Sparc Leadership Award – 2003
 Commonwealth Games  – 2006
 Member of the New Zealand Order of Merit, for services to basketball – 2011 Queen's Birthday Honours.
 Inducted into FIBA Hall of Fame – 2017

References

External links
FIBA Profile
FIBA Hall of Fame Profile
Cameron's 300-game milestone

1974 births
Living people
2002 FIBA World Championship players
2006 FIBA World Championship players
2010 FIBA World Championship players
Auckland Stars players
Bandırma B.İ.K. players
Basketball players at the 2000 Summer Olympics
Basketball players at the 2004 Summer Olympics
Basketball players at the 2006 Commonwealth Games
Cheshire Jets players
Commonwealth Games medallists in basketball
Commonwealth Games silver medallists for New Zealand
FIBA Hall of Fame inductees
Mahram Tehran BC players
Members of the New Zealand Order of Merit
New Zealand expatriate basketball people in Australia
New Zealand expatriate basketball people in England
New Zealand expatriate basketball people in Iran
New Zealand expatriate basketball people in Malaysia
New Zealand expatriate basketball people in Turkey
New Zealand Māori sportspeople
New Zealand men's basketball players
Olympic basketball players of New Zealand
People educated at Whangarei Boys' High School
Power forwards (basketball)
Sportspeople from Tokoroa
Waikato Pistons players
Waikato Titans players
Medallists at the 2006 Commonwealth Games